Besim Muzaqi (born 5 December 1979) is a politician in Kosovo. He was the deputy mayor of Vushtrri (Serbian: Vučitrn) from 2017 to 2021 and has been a member of the Assembly of the Republic of Kosovo since 2021. Muzaqi is a member of Vetëvendosje.

Early life and private career
Muzaqi was born in Mitrovica in what was then the Socialist Autonomous Province of Kosovo in the Socialist Republic of Serbia, Socialist Federal Republic of Yugoslavia. Raised in Vushtrri, he graduated from the University of Pristina with a master's degree from the Faculty of Pharmacy. He later earned a second master's degree in Food Engineering and Technology (2014). Muzaqi has served one term as president of the Kosovo Pharmaceutical Association.

Politician
Muzaqi joined Vetëvendosje in 2010 and has served on the party's presidency. He was included on the party's electoral list for the Vushtrri municipal assembly in the 2013 Kosovan local elections and its list for the Kosovo assembly in 2014 parliamentary election, although he was not elected on either occasion.

He was the Vetëvendosje candidate for mayor of Vushtrri in the 2017 Kosovan local elections and finished third. His party participated in a local coalition government after the election, and he was appointed as the municipality's deputy mayor in December 2017. He ran for the Kosovo assembly again in the 2019 assembly election and was again not elected.

Parliamentarian
Muzaqi was given the thirty-second position on Vetëvendosje's list in the 2021 assembly election, which was held under open list proportional representation. He finished in fifty-sixth place among the party's candidates and was elected when the list won fifty-eight mandates. Vetëvendosje won a significant victory in the election and subsequently became the dominant force in a coalition government; Muzaqi serves as a supporter of the administration. He is a member of the assembly committee on public administration, local government, media, and regional development.

Electoral record

Local

Notes

References

1979 births
Living people
Kosovo Albanians
People from Mitrovica, Kosovo
People from Vushtrri
Members of the Assembly of the Republic of Kosovo
Vetëvendosje politicians